Esko Olavi Ahonen (born June 13, 1955 in Evijärvi) is a Finnish politician and member of the parliament from the Centre Party. He was elected to Parliament of Finland in 2003 for the constituency of Vaasa. In the 2011 election he was dropped out of the parliament.

References

1955 births
Living people
People from Evijärvi
Centre Party (Finland) politicians
Members of the Parliament of Finland (2003–07)
Members of the Parliament of Finland (2007–11)